Whitney White (born December 23, 1985), known as Naptural85 on YouTube, is an American vlogger, blogger, natural hair enthusiast, and entrepreneur. She started sharing her story from her first video “Natural Hair Journey”, which showed her hair transition from relaxed to natural hair.

Biography 
Whitney White was a studio art major in college with a concentration in Graphic design.

Although initially posting videos on YouTube was just a way to help others and relieve stress, White's YouTube channel “Naptural85” now has over 900k subscribers and millions of views. Her story continues to inspire women with the same or similar hair type. She also shares her lifestyle with her followers via second and third YouTube channels, DearNaptural85 and WhitneyWhite.

Best known as Naptural85 on YouTube, White is also a reliable source of information regarding current issues facing the natural hair community. She has worked with major brands like Carol's Daughter and has become a force in the black hair industry.

The Naptural85 brand is known for natural haircare including how-to styles, DIY treatments, and industry knowledge. In August 2015, White was referred to as the Michelle Phan of the “natural hair movement” by Alana Yzola of Business Insider. Her work has been appreciated by public figures including Dominique Dawes and Kelly Rowland who have revealed how delighted they are with her easy and helpful tips, informative tutorials and tricks for maintaining their hairstyles. Her natural hairstyles and hair routines have helped many who are struggling with their naturally curly hair come to love and maintain their beautiful hair.

Melanin Haircare 
In October 2018, White and her sister Taffeta White launched Melanin Haircare, a hair care company selling natural products, which are evaluated against the Environmental Working Group criteria.

Awards 
 BFab best hair blogger 2014
 Best natural hair blog 2015

See also 
 Natural hair movement
 Melanin

References

External links 
 naptural85.com
 naptural85 YouTube Channel

Living people
Video bloggers
American YouTubers
Beauty and makeup YouTubers
African-American people
YouTube channels launched in 2009
American women bloggers
American bloggers
1985 births
21st-century American women
21st-century African-American women writers
21st-century American women writers
21st-century African-American writers